Ra'anana (lit. "Fresh") is a city in the southern Sharon Plain of the Central District of Israel. It was founded in 1922 as an American-Jewish settlement, 1 km south of the village of Tabsur, where an important World War I battle had taken place four years previously.

While the majority of its residents are native-born Israeli Jews, a large part of the population consists of Jewish immigrants from the Americas and Europe.

Ra'anana's industrial park, built over the depopulated village of Tabsur, is home to global and local start-up companies. It was designated a "Green City" by the World Health Organization in 2005.

History

Before the 20th century, Ra'ananna formed part of the Forest of Sharon, a hallmark of the region's historical landscape. It was an open woodland dominated by Mount Tabor Oak (Quercus ithaburensis), which extended from Kfar Yona in the north to Ra’ananna in the south. The local Arab inhabitants traditionally used the area for pasture, firewood and intermittent cultivation. The intensification of settlement and agriculture in the coastal plain during the 19th century led to deforestation and subsequent environmental degradation known from Hebrew sources.

In 1912, the Company for Jewish Settlement in Israel formed the "Ahuza A – New York" group to purchase land in Palestine for agricultural settlement. World War I delayed their plans, but in 1921, it was decided to establish a settlement. On April 2, 1922, two wagons left the corner of Lilienblum and Herzl Streets in Tel Aviv carrying four "Ahuza" members, three laborers and two armed watchmen. After a five-hour journey, they unloaded their baggage at the place destined to become Ra'anana.

In its early days, the settlement was called "Ahuza A – New York." The Arabs of the region called it "Little America" as most of its residents were English speakers and came from New York. Later it was renamed "Ra'anania" and finally the founding settlers chose "Ra'anana" as its official name.

The settlement was built along a main street, Ahuza Street, and six other streets, three to the north of Ahuza Street and three to the south. Between 1925 and 1927, the Community House, which would house a variety of public institutions, including the secretariat, clinic, synagogue, meeting place for local committee meetings, assembly hall, culture room, school, kindergarten, clinic, and post office, was built. According to a census conducted in 1931 by the British Mandate authorities, Ra'anana had a population of 615 inhabitants in 182 houses.

In 1936, it was given local council status. By 1948, the year of Israel's formation, Ra'anana was a town of 3,000 residents. The same year, the nearby Palestinian Arab village of Tabsur was depopulated. The city later expanded over its ruins. This had grown to 5,900 in 1949.
In the 1980s Ra'anana was declared a city.

Eitan Ginzburg, acting mayor of Ra'anana in 2018, was Israel's first openly gay mayor.

Local government

Mayors

Baruch Ostrovsky (1931–1955)
Michael Pasweig (1955–1957)
Baruch Ostrovsky (1957–1959, second time)
Michael Pasweig (1959–1960, second time)
Yitzhak Skolnik (1960–1969)
Benyamin Wolfovich (1969–1989)
Ze'ev Bielski (1989–2005)
Uzi Cohen (2005, interim)
Nahum Hofree (2005–2013)
Ze'ev Bielski (2013–2018, second time)
Eitan Ginzburg (2018)
Chaim Broyde (2018–present)

Demographics

Ra'anana's population consists mainly of native-born Israelis, but about 22% of the city's residents are immigrants to Israel (Ra'anana is ranked second in immigrant absorption in Israel, after Netanya). It is home to a large number of immigrants from English-speaking countries, a significant number of immigrants from Latin America, mainly Argentina, and also absorbed large numbers of immigrants from the former Soviet Union. In recent years the number of French immigrants is also on the rise. 

Though the majority of Ra'anana residents are secular, there is a sizeable religious community, mainly consisting of Modern Orthodox Jews, many of whom are immigrants from the US, UK, South Africa and France. The religious community generally lives on the north side and the secular community on the southern sides. There are nearly 100 synagogues in Ra'anana, ranging from small minyanim to large edifices, and including a wide range of traditions, including Reform, Sefaradi, Ashkenazi, Yemenite, Afghani and Libyan synagogues. Many of these synagogues cater to specific immigrant groups. There is also a small Hasidic community of Clevelander Hasidim, led by the Clevelander Rebbe of Ra'anana, Rabbi Yitzchok Rosenbaum. The orthodox chief rabbi of the city is Rabbi Yitzhak Peretz.

Industry and commerce

Ra'anana has an industrial zone in the north of the city, which is home to Renanim shopping mall and many high-tech companies, including Emblaze, Hewlett-Packard, NICE Systems, SAP, NCR Corporation (formerly Retalix), Comverse, Red Hat, Waze (prior to Google acquisition), Texas Instruments, Arm Holdings and ZoomInfo. In addition, Microsoft's head office in Israel and Amdocs are located in an office complex at the eastern edge of the city, close to Ra'anana Junction, where Highway 4 meets Ahuza Street, Ra'anana's main boulevard. Ahuza Street runs through the city from east to west and is lined with shops, restaurants and a cultural center.

Education
Ra'anana has 12 elementary schools, 10 middle schools and 8 high-schools.

Educational programs for gifted students start in the third grade. A program for the encouragement of girls to study technological subjects has been developed as well as a technology-focused leadership development and information management program, the first of its kind in Israel. The program, created in conjunction with "Ness Technologies", uses advanced technology as a catalyst for developing skills.

Ra'anana has developed supplementary education programs for the afternoon and evening hours, which meet the needs of thousands of children, aged 5–18. These programs foster creativity, promote social involvement and cultivate leadership skills. The supplementary education projects include over 20 "Batei Talmid" citywide extracurricular programs, an afternoon daycare program, and music, dance, art and science centers. Other programs include summer camps and summer activities, university for youth, dance troupes, the Children's Parliament, an acting school, a school for the performing arts, and gifted children programs, that serve as a model for many other cities.

Ra'anana is home to the Open University of Israel and Ra'anana College.

Parks and museums

Park Ra'anana is the largest urban park in the Sharon region. It offers walking and bike paths, sports fields, a zoo and children's petting corner and a lake in a clover shape reminiscent of Ra'anana's coat of arms. There are two fountains in the lake and pedestrians can cross over it on the bridge. The lake is surrounded by special gardens, including the Seven Species garden, and shaded walking paths. There is also a restaurant and a small art gallery. The Founders Museum presents the story of Ra'anana's original settlers, from the arrival of the Ahuza Alef-New York Association until Ra'anana achieved local council status in 1936.

Ra'anana Park Amphitheatre has been the venue for musical acts such as A-ha, Backstreet Boys, Evanescence, Alice Cooper, Lauryn Hill, Tori Amos, Chick Corea, Ian Anderson, Ziggy Marley, The Cranberries, The Stranglers, Seal, Brian Wilson, Regina Spektor, Blondie and Pet Shop Boys.

Hospitals and medical facilities
Ra'anana is home to the Loewenstein Hospital Rehabilitation Center. Loewenstein was established in 1958 and is the only rehabilitation hospital operated by Clalit Health Services, Israel's largest health care provider. Its current multi-floor building is situated in a large gardened area and accommodates 240 rehabilitative beds for short and long term hospital care.

As a national rehabilitative center, patients are admitted from all parts of the country, all health funds, from the Ministry of Defense, the Ministry of Health, and from general hospitals and clinics, both from Israel and overseas.

The Loewenstein campus also hosts other Clalit services such as a child development center and a clinic for alternative holistic treatments partially subsidized by Clalit's insurance plan.

Sports
The main soccer club of the city is Hapoel Ra'anana. In basketball, the city is represented by Maccabi Ra'anana who play in the National League.

The Ra'anana Roosters are the local rugby team, and the area is a center of rugby union in Israel, with Rugby Israel being based there.
With a large population of American expatriates, the Ra'anana Express are an inaugural team in the Israel Baseball League.

Notable people

Tamar Ariav (born 1949), professor of education and President of Beit Berl College
Mili Avital (born 1972), actress
Rami Bar-Niv (born 1945), concert pianist, composer and author
Naftali Bennett (born 1972), politician, former Prime Minister of Israel, former leader of the Yamina party and the Jewish Home parties
Adi Bielski (born 1982), theater and movie actress
Peter Deutsch (born 1957), former US congressman
Meital Dohan (born 1976), actress and musician
Raanan Gissin, political scientist
Israel Gohberg (1928–2009), mathematician
Yael Grobglas (born 1984), actress
Yotam Halperin (born 1984), basketball player
 Nitzan Hanochi (born 1986), basketball player
Yihye Haybi (1911–1977), photographer
Haim Hefer (1925–2012), songwriter, poet, and writer
Noa Kirel (born 2001), singer, actress, and television host
Roi Klein (1975–2006), major in the Golani Brigade
Uzi Landau (born 1943), former politician, former minister
Keren Leibovitch (born 1973), champion paralympic swimmer
Yehuda Levi (born 1979), actor, model
Dani Litani (born 1943), musician
Daniel Maddy-Weitzman (born 1986), baseball player
Shuli Natan (born 1947), singer
Ruhama Raz (born 1955), singer
Paul L. Smith (1936–2012), American-born actor
Eli Vakil (born 1953), clinical neuropsychologist
Yoni Wolf (born 1979), model
Lidor Yosefi (born 1974), singer

Twin towns

Ra'anana has twin cities agreements with:

References

External links

Official municipal website

 
Cities in Central District (Israel)
Cities in Israel
Sharon plain
Populated places established in 1922
1922 establishments in Mandatory Palestine